The 1988 United States presidential election in Massachusetts took place on November 8, 1988, as part of the 1988 United States presidential election, which was held throughout all 50 states and D.C. Voters chose 13 representatives, or electors to the Electoral College, who voted for president and vice president.

Massachusetts voted for Democratic nominee Michael Dukakis, the state's governor, over Republican Vice President George H. W. Bush. The Commonwealth was both candidates' birth state and 1988 was the most recent cycle in which both major party candidates have shared a birth state.

Dukakis, the sitting governor of Massachusetts, won his home state with 53.23% of the vote to Bush's 45.38%, a 7.85% margin of victory. This made it one of ten states (plus the District of Columbia) to vote for Dukakis, even though Bush won a convincing electoral victory nationwide. Massachusetts was a solid 16% more Democratic than the national average in 1988. Massachusetts had been a Democratic-leaning state since 1928, and a Democratic stronghold since 1960. Although it was already a Democratic-leaning state, this would be the last time that Republicans would be at all competitive in Massachusetts, as secular liberal New England rejected an increasingly conservative Republican Party dominated by Evangelical Christians. Not only has it continued to vote Democratic in every presidential election that followed, but no Republican since has broken 40% in Massachusetts, or even won a single county in the state.

This was also the last time that a Republican presidential nominee won any of the state's 14 counties, namely Barnstable, Plymouth, and Worcester Counties. Dukakis won 11 counties in Massachusetts to Bush's three. Dukakis's strongest county was Suffolk County, home to the state's capital and largest city, Boston, where he took 64.02% of the vote. Bush's strongest county win was suburban Plymouth County, where he took 54.62% of the vote; however, Bush became the first Republican president to win the White House without carrying Franklin County. Since favorite son presidential nominee John F. Kennedy won the presidency in 1960, Dukakis became the first of three major party nominees from Massachusetts to lose a presidential race. John Kerry (U.S. senator) and Mitt Romney (former governor) lost the 2004 and 2012 presidential elections, respectively.

As of 2020, this was the last time that the cities of Amesbury, Attleboro, Beverly, Braintree, Brockton, Franklin, Leominster, Marlborough, and Methuen and the towns of Abington, Alford, Auburn, Avon, Ayer, Barnstable, Massachusetts, Bedford, Bernardston, Bolton, Boxborough, Buckland, Burlington, Canton, Carlisle, Charlemont, Chelmsford, Clinton, Cummington, Danvers, Dedham, Dennis, Erving, Essex, Florida, Gosnold, Grafton, Groton, Hancock, Harvard, Harwich, Hawley, Holbrook, Holliston, Hopedale, Hudson, Ipswich, Littleton, Longmeadow, Manchester-by-the-Sea, Mansfield, Marblehead, Marion, Mattapoisett, Medway, Milton, Mount Washington, Needham, New Ashford, New Salem, Newbury, Northborough, Norton, Peru, Petersham, Plymouth, Reading, Rockland, Savoy, Sheffield, Shelburne, Shirley, Shrewsbury, Southborough, Southampton, Stow, Sudbury, Wakefield, Wellesley, West Newbury, Westborough, Westford, Westhampton, Weston, Winchester, Windsor, and Yarmouth voted Republican.

Results

Results by congressional district
Dukakis won 9 of 11 congressional districts, including the 1st district, which simultaneously elected Republican Silvio O. Conte to the House of Representatives. Bush won the 3rd and 5th districts, which simultaneously elected Democrats to the House.

Results by county

Results by municipality

See also
 Presidency of George H. W. Bush
 United States presidential elections in Massachusetts

References

Massachusetts
1988
1988 Massachusetts elections